Pickersgill is a surname, and may refer to:

Barbara Pickersgill (born 1940), British botanist
Edward Pickersgill (1850–1911), English politician
Frank Pickersgill, (1915–1944) Canadian World War II hero
Frederick Richard Pickersgill (1820–1900), English painter and illustrator
Greg Pickersgill (born 1951), British science fiction fan
Henry William Pickersgill (1782–1875), English portrait painter
Jack Pickersgill (1905–1997), Canadian civil servant and politician; also J. W. Pickersgill
John Cunliffe Pickersgill-Cunliffe (1819–1873), British member of Parliament
Jeanette Pickersgill (?–1885), British poet, wife of Henry William Pickersgill
Kenneth Pickersgill, South African Army general
Mary Young Pickersgill (born Mary Young, 1776–1857), American flagmaker
Richard Pickersgill (1749–1779), British naval officer for whom the Pickersgill Islands were named
Steve Pickersgill (born 1985), English rugby player
William Pickersgill (1861–1928), English mechanical engineer